Sten Gösta William Wahlund (1901 — 1976) was a Swedish statistician, race biologist and politician. He is best known for first identifying the Wahlund effect, that subpopulations with different allele frequencies cause reduced heterozygosity than what is expected from Hardy–Weinberg equilibrium.

He graduated from Uppsala University in 1924 and received a PhD in 1933, while working at the State Institute for Racial Biology. He later became important in the Bondeförbundet and was a member of the Swedish parliament.

References

1901 births
1976 deaths
Swedish biologists
Centre Party (Sweden) politicians
Members of the Första kammaren
Uppsala University alumni
20th-century biologists